Muhammad Rifaldi (born 3 October 1996) is an Indonesian professional footballer who plays for Liga 1 club Dewa United, on loan from club Persik Kediri. A versatile player, Rifaldi has also played as a right-back, centre-back and defensive midfielder.

Club career

Bandung United
In 2019, Rifaldi signed a contract with Indonesian Liga 2 club Bandung United.

Sriwijaya
He was signed for Sriwijaya to play in Liga 2 in the 2020 season. This season was suspended on 27 March 2020 due to the COVID-19 pandemic. The season was abandoned and was declared void on 20 January 2021.

Persiraja Banda Aceh
In 2021, Rifaldi signed a contract with Indonesian Liga 1 club Persiraja Banda Aceh. Rifaldi made his first-team debut on 29 August 2021 in a match against Bhayangkara at the Indomilk Arena, Tangerang.

Persik Kediri
Rifaldi was signed for Persik Kediri to play in Liga 1 in the 2022–23 season. He made his league debut on 19 August 2022 in a match against PSIS Semarang at the Jatidiri Stadium, Semarang.

Career statistics

Club

References

External links
 
 Muhammad Rifaldi at Liga Indonesia

1996 births
Living people
Indonesian footballers
Association football midfielders
Association football defenders
Persipal Palu players
Persinga Ngawi players
Bandung United F.C. players
Sriwijaya F.C. players
Persiraja Banda Aceh players
Persik Kediri players
Liga 2 (Indonesia) players
Liga 1 (Indonesia) players
People from Palu
Sportspeople from Central Sulawesi